Aspidoscelis preopatae is a species of teiid lizard endemic to Sonora in Mexico.

References

preopatae
Reptiles described in 2021
Reptiles of Mexico